Uttamadhanapuram Venkatasubbaiyer Swaminatha Iyer (19 February 1855 – 28 April 1942) was a Tamil scholar and researcher who was instrumental in bringing many long-forgotten works of classical Tamil literature to light. His singular efforts over five decades brought to light major literary works in Tamil and contributed vastly to the enrichment of its literary heritage. Iyer published over 90 books in his lifetime, on a variety of matters connected to classical Tamil literature, and collected over 3,000 paper manuscripts, palm-leaf manuscripts and notes of various kinds.

He is affectionately called Tamil Thatha (literally, "Tamil grandfather").

Early life
Utthamadhanapuram Venkatasubramanian Swaminathan was born on 19 February 1855 in the village of Suriyamoolai near Kumbakonam in present-day Tamil Nadu.

Academic career
Swaminatha Iyer learned Tamil literature and grammar for five years as a devoted student to Mahavidvan Meenakshi Sundaram Pillai, a great poet and scholar.  He was also a beneficiary of the reputed Saiva Mutt at Thiruvavaduthurai. Tyagaraja Chettiar was the head of the Tamil Department at the Government Arts College, Kumbakonam. A student of Meenakshi Sundaram Pillai, he was a man of great erudition and was held in high esteem alike by his pupils and by the public. When Chettiar retired, he recommended that Swaminatha Iyer be invited to take his place. Swaminatha Iyer was duly appointed to that post on 16 February 1880. During his tenure at the College, Swaminatha Iyer met Salem Ramaswami Mudaliar, a civil munsif who had been recently transferred to Kumbakonam. The friendship between them proved to be a turning point in Swaminatha Iyer's life. Mudaliar was responsible for persuading Iyer to edit and publish the ancient Tamil classics. Swaminatha Iyer had till then confined his enjoyment of Tamil literature to medieval works. Mudaliar also gave him a handwritten copy of Seevaga Sindhamani for publication.

Manuscript recovery

As the Civaka Cintamani was a Jain classic, Swaminatha Iyer went to the homes of learned member of the Jain community in Kumbakonam to get some doubts cleared. He also read the Jain epics and collated several manuscript versions and arrived at a correct conclusion. It was due to his efforts that the Cevaka Cintamani was published in 1887. From that time onwards, he began to search for Sangam classics with a view to editing and publishing them. After the Cevaka Cintamani, the Pattupattu was published.

Thus began Swaminatha Iyer's long search for the original texts of ancient literary works during which he regularly worked with C. W. Damodaram Pillai. It was a search that lasted until his death. Many people voluntarily parted with the manuscripts in their possession. Swaminatha Iyer visited almost every hamlet and knocked at every door. He employed all the resources at his command to get at the works. As a result, a large number of literary works which were gathering dust as palm-leaf manuscripts in lofts, storerooms, boxes and cupboards saw the light of day. Of them, the Cilappatikaram, Manimekalai and Purananuru were received by Tamil lovers with a lot of enthusiasm. Purananuru, which mirrored the lives of Tamils during the Sangam period, prompted scholarly research on the subject. In a span of about five decades, Swaminatha Iyer published about 100 books, including minor poems, lyrics, puranas and bhakti (devotional) works. He was supported financially by Tamil enthusiasts such as Pandithurai Thevar, Zamindhar of Palavanatham, in publishing the books.

Swaminatha Iyer retired from active teaching in 1919. His research work increased several times after retirement. He travelled from place to place in search of palm leaf manuscripts so as to edit and publish them. From 1924 to 1927, Iyer was the Principal of the Meenakshi Tamil College in Annamalai University, Chidambaram. On health grounds, he resigned the post, came to Madras and continued his research.

Contributions to Tamil music

Another significant contribution made by Swaminatha Iyer is in the realm of Tamil music. Until Swaminatha Iyer published the Cilappatikaram, Pattupattu and Ettuthokai, music was a grey area in Tamil research. During the previous four centuries, Telugu and Sanskrit dominated the music scene in Tamil Nadu in the absence of any valuable information on Tamil music. Swaminatha Iyer's publications threw light on the presence of Tamil music in the earlier centuries and paved the way for serious research on the subject. As the son of a famous musician of his time, Swaminatha Iyer learnt music from Gopalakrishna Bharathi, a musical exponent and the author of Nandan Sarithiram.

His autobiography
Swaminatha Iyer published his autobiography, En Saritham, serialised in the Tamil weekly Ananda Vikatan, from January 1940 to May 1942. It was later published as a book in 1950. Running into 762 pages, the book is an excellent account of the life and times of villages, especially in the Thanjavur district in the late 19th century. The Tamil is simple and peppered with many observations on people as well as descriptions of school life, life in monasteries (Mutts). The book also reveals the enormous perseverance of U V Swaminatha Iyer in his quest to master Tamil and save manuscripts.

Legacy and honours

It was primarily due to his and C. W. Damodaram Pillai's efforts that the world came to know the literary output of the ancient Tamils and their past. Tamil poet and nationalist Subramania Bharati, who inspired the freedom movement with his songs, admired Swaminatha Iyer. Paying tribute to Swaminatha Iyer in one of his poems, Bharati equated Iyer with the sage, Agastya when he called him Kumbamuni. (Agastya, who was among the first exponents of Tamil, was supposed to have been born in a Kumbha—a kind of vessel—hence the name Kumbamuni) and said: "So long as Tamil lives, poets will venerate you and pay obeisance to you. You will ever shine as an immortal."

The meeting of Rabindranath Tagore and the grand old man of Tamil literature in 1926 in Chennai was a historic moment. Not only did Tagore call on Swaminatha Iyer, but also penned a poem in praise of his efforts to salvage ancient classical Tamil literary works from palm leaf manuscripts.

The honorary doctoral degree (D.Litt.) was conferred on Iyer by the University of Madras in 1906. In recognition of his outstanding literary accomplishments and contributions, he was also honoured with the title, Mahamahopathiyaya, literally: "Greatest of great teachers". In the same year, when the Prince and Princess of Wales visited Madras, a function was arranged where Swaminatha Iyer was honoured. Iyer was awarded the title of Dakshinathya Kalanidhi in 1925. In 1932, the Madras University awarded an honorary PhD to him in recognition of his services in the cause of Tamil. Indian Postal department issued a commemorative postage stamp on 18 February 2006. His house in Uthamadhanapuram has been converted as a Memorial.

References

Further reading
 En Charitram - Autobiography of U.V.Swaminatha Ayyar in Tamil (Part 1)
 En Charitram - Autobiography of U.V.Swaminatha Ayyar in Tamil (Part 2)
 En Charitram - Autobiography of U.V.Swaminatha Ayyar in Tamil (Part 3)
 En Charitram - Autobiography of U.V.Swaminatha Ayyar in Tamil (Part 4)
 En Charitram - Autobiography of U.V.Swaminatha Ayyar in Tamil (Part 5)
 Viswanathan, S., The patriarch of Tamil, Frontline Volume 22 – Issue 05, 26 Feb – 11 March 2005
 Pradeep Chakravarthy's article on "The Hindu" – Grand Old Man of Tamizh Grand Old Man of Tamizh – Article on "The Hindu"

External links
 

Swaminatha Iyer, U.V.
Swaminatha Iyer, U.V.
Swaminatha Iyer, U.V.
Dravidologists
People from Thanjavur district
Academic staff of Annamalai University